Moscow, third Rome is a theological and political concept asserting Moscow as the successor to ancient Rome, with the Russian world carrying forward the legacy of the Roman Empire. The term "third Rome" refers to a historical topic of debate in European culture: the question of the successor city to the "first Rome" (Rome, within the Western Roman Empire) and the "second Rome" (Constantinople, within the Eastern Roman Empire).

Concept 

"Moscow, Third Rome" is a theological and a political concept which was formulated in the 15th–16th centuries in the Tsardom of Rus.

In this concept, three interrelated and interpenetrating fields of ideas can be found:
Theology that is linked with justification of necessity and inevitability of the unity of the Eastern Orthodox Church.
Social policy derived out of the feeling of unity in East Slavic territories being historically tied through Christian Eastern Orthodox faith and Slavic culture.
State doctrine according to which the Moscow Prince should act as a supreme ruler (Sovereign and legislator) of Christian Eastern Orthodox nations and become a defender of the Christian Eastern Orthodox Church. Herewith the Church should facilitate the Sovereign in execution of his function supposedly determined by God, the autocratic administration.

History

Before the fall of Constantinople 
After the fall of Tǎrnovo to the Ottoman Turks in 1393, a number of Bulgarian clergymen sought shelter in the Russian lands and transferred the idea of the Third Rome there, which eventually resurfaced in Tver, during the reign of Boris of Tver, when the monk Foma (Thomas) of Tver had written The Eulogy of the Pious Grand Prince Boris Alexandrovich in 1453.

After the fall of Constantinople 

Within decades after the capture of Constantinople by Mehmed II of the Ottoman Empire on 29 May 1453, some Eastern Orthodox people were nominating Moscow as the "Third Rome", or the "New Rome".

The Turks captured Constantinople in 1453 and the fortress of Mangup – the last fragment of the Empire of Trebizond and thus the Byzantine Empire – fell at the end of 1475. Even before the fall of Constantinople, the Eastern Orthodox Slavic states in the Balkans had fallen under Turkish rule. The fall of Constantinople caused tremendous fears, many considered the fall of Constantinople as a sign the End time was near (in 1492 it was 7000 Anno Mundi); others believed that the emperor of the Holy Roman Empire (although he was a Roman Catholic) now took the place of the emperors of Constantinople. There were also hopes that Constantinople would be liberated soon. Moreover, the Eastern Orthodox Church was left without its Eastern Orthodox Basileus. Therefore, the question arose of who would become the new basileus. At the end of the various "Tales" about the fall of Constantinople, which gained great popularity in Moscow, it was directly stated that the Rus' people would defeat the Ishmaelites (Muslims) and their king would become the basileus in the City of Seven Hills (Constantinople). The Grand Prince of Moscow remained the strongest of the Eastern Orthodox rulers; Ivan III married Sophia Paleologue, broke his formal subordination to the Golden Horde (already divided into several Tatar kingdoms) and became an independent ruler. All of this strengthened Moscow's claims to primacy in the Eastern Orthodox world. However, the liberation of Constantinople was still far away — the Moscow State had no opportunity to fight the Ottoman Empire.

End of the 15th century 
At the end of the 15th century, the emergence of the idea that Moscow is truly a new Rome can be found; the whole idea of Moscow as third Rome could be traced as early as 1492, when Metropolitan of Moscow Zosimus expressed it. Metropolitan Zosima, in a foreword to his work of 1492 Presentation of the Paschalion, quite clearly expressed it, calling Ivan III "the new Tsar Constantine of the new city of Constantine — Moscow." This idea is best known in the presentation of the monk Philotheus of the early 16th century:

The Moscow scholars explained the fall of Constantinople as the divine punishment for the sin of the Union with the Catholic Church, but they did not want to obey the Patriarch of Constantinople, although there were no unionist patriarchs since the Turkish conquest in 1453 and the first Patriarch since then, Gennadius Scholarius, was the leader of the anti-unionists. At the next synod, held in Constantinople in 1484, the Union was finally declared invalid. Having lost its Christian basileus after the Turkish conquest, Constantinople as a center of power lost a significant part of its authority. On the contrary, the Moscow rulers soon began to consider themselves real Tsars (this title was already used by Ivan III), and therefore according to them the center of the Eastern Orthodox Church should have been located in Moscow, and thus the bishop of Moscow should become the head of the Orthodoxy. The text of the bishop's oath in Muscovy, edited in 1505–1511, condemned the ordination of metropolitans in Constantinople, calling it "the ordination in the area of godless Turks, by the pagan tsar."

Stirrings of this sentiment began during the reign of Ivan III of Russia, who styled himself Czar (cf. Caesar), who had married Sophia Paleologue. Sophia was a niece of Constantine XI, the last Byzantine emperor.  By the rules and laws of inheritance followed by most European monarchies of the time, Ivan could claim that he and his offspring were heirs of the fallen Empire, but the Roman traditions of the empire had never recognized automatic inheritance of the Imperial office.

Since the 16th century 

It was also Sophia's brother, Andreas Palaiologos, who held the rights of succession to the Byzantine throne. Andreas died in 1502, having sold his titles and royal and imperial rights to Ferdinand II of Aragon and Isabella I of Castile. A stronger claim was based on religious symbolism. The Orthodox faith was central to Byzantine notions of their identity and what distinguished them from "barbarians". Vladimir the Great had converted Kievan Rus' to Orthodoxy in 988, in return for which he became the first barbarian to ever get an Imperial princess as a wife.

"The liturgical privileges that the Byzantine emperor enjoyed carried over to the Muscovite tsar. In 1547, for instance, when Ivan IV was crowned tsar, not only was he anointed as the Byzantine emperor had been after the late twelfth century, but he was also allowed to communicate in the sanctuary with the clergy."

During Ecumenical Patriarch Jeremias II's visit to Moscow in 1588-9 "to collect funds to assist the [Eastern] Orthodox communities living in the Ottoman Empire", Jeremias recognized in 1589 the Metropolitan of Moscow as patriarch.  This recognition was "a victory for those who saw Moscow as the Third Rome."

Shortly before Joseph II inherited the States of the House of Austria, he traveled to Russia in 1780. In her conversations with him Catherine II made it clear that she would renew the Byzantine empire and to use her one-year-old grandson Konstantin as Emperor of Constantinople. The guest tried to suggest to the host that he could be held harmless in the Papal States.

Russian world 

The Russian world is ecclesiastical in its form, but geopolitical in its essence; it is a concept that was put forward in a keynote speech on November 3, 2009, by Patriarch Kirill (Gundyayev) of Moscow which he described as a "common civilisational space" of countries sharing Eastern Orthodoxy, Russian culture and language, and a common historical memory. The "Russian world" under the Patriarch Kirill focused only on the Eastern Slavic countries of Eastern Europe; that is, on Ukraine and Belarus, while leading the Russian Orthodox Church to isolate itself.

The ideas of the Russian world are used as a justification for the revival of the Russian Empire.  It has been suggested that Vladimir Putin envisions a recreation of Russia's "mission", at least in terms of the Slavic people, although it has also been noted that this viewpoint may be highly exaggerated.

See also 

15th–16th century Moscow–Constantinople schism
Holy Rus
 Legacy of the Roman Empire
 Moscow–Constantinople schism (disambiguation)
New Rome
 Nova Roma
Romanov Empire (micronation)
Russian Empire
Russian imperialism
Russian world
Second Rome (disambiguation)
 Succession of the Roman Empire
Translatio imperii

Notes

References

Citations

Sources

Further reading 
 

 

 
 

15th-century establishments in Russia
Christian messianism
City nicknames
History of Eastern Orthodoxy in Russia
15th century in the Grand Duchy of Moscow
16th century in the Grand Duchy of Moscow
Politics of the Russian Empire
Russian nationalism
Eastern Orthodox theology
Legacy of the Roman Empire
Russian philosophy